The Raccoon Creek Group is a geologic group in Indiana. It preserves fossils dating back to the Carboniferous period.

See also

 List of fossiliferous stratigraphic units in Indiana

References
 

Geologic groups of Indiana